Robert K. Smith may refer to:
 Robert Kimmel Smith (born 1930), novelist and children's author
 Robert Knowlton Smith (1887–1973), Conservative member of the Canadian House of Commons